David Ndii (born in Kiambu, Kenya) is an economist, a columnist, and an author. The Telegraph has described him as "one of Africa's best known economists and an outspoken anti-corruption crusader".

Early life and education 
He is a Rhodes scholar at Oxford University and an Eisenhower Fellow. Ndii holds a doctorate and master's degrees in economics from Oxford, masters and bachelor's degrees from the University of Nairobi.

Politics 
For several years, he was chief strategist of the National Super Alliance.

In recent years he has been an open critic of the economic policy of the Uhuru Kenyatta administration, writing several open letters and tweets criticizing the government's economic policies and borrowing of loans. This, among other things, led to him being barred from accessing the Technical University of Mombasa for "security reasons".

Ndii opposed Kenyatta and Prime Minister Raila Odinga's signature handshake project, the Building Bridges Initiative. Together with other activists, he petitioned the High Court of Kenya in the landmark David Ndii & Others V. Attorney General & Others case which was argued all the way to the Supreme Court of Kenya leading to the collapse of the Building Bridges Initiative.

He would go on to support the presidential bid of William Ruto. He subsequently was involved in the crafting of the Kenya Kwanza manifesto which was anchored on the bottom-up economic agenda. After Ruto won the Presidency, Ndii was appointed the chairperson of the President's Council of Economic Advisors (CEA) in President Ruto's State House.

Career 
He is the chairman of the board of Zimele Asset Management Company Limited and the managing director of African Economics.

Ndii has previously served as an economic advisor to the Government of Rwanda and led the NARC Economic Recovery Strategy (ERS) taskforce which was widely credited with the post-2003 economic recovery in Kenya. He cofounded Kenya's first independent policy think tank, the Institute of Economic Affairs, together with Prof. Anyang' Nyong'o.

Ndii lectured at Strathmore University.

References 

21st-century Kenyan economists
Alumni of the University of Oxford
Living people
Kenyan columnists
University of Nairobi alumni
Year of birth missing (living people)